These are the Canadian number-one albums of 1980 as compiled by RPM.

(Beginning with the missing publication on September 20, RPM published every other week until the end of the year, resuming regular weekly publications on January 24, 1981. Issues from the point of alternation bear consecutive identification numbers, September 13 being Vol 33, No. 25, followed by September 27 as Vol. 33, No. 26, October 11 as Vol. 34, No. 1, culminating in the December 20 issue, as Vol. 34, No. 6. with January 24, 1981 as Vol. 34, No. 7.) Beginning December 6, the list of Top RPM 100 albums was reduced to 50.

See also
List of Canadian number-one singles of 1980

References

1980
1980 record charts
1980 in Canadian music